The discography of the English singer Matt Cardle consists of four studio albums, one live album, seventeen singles and eleven music videos.

Cardle signed a joint deal with Syco and Columbia Records after winning the seventh series of The X Factor.  His winner's single "When We Collide" topped the UK Singles Chart to become the 2010 Christmas number 1 and remained there for three consecutive weeks.  In June 2012 the song reached the one million sale mark, making it the 123rd single to sell a million copies in the UK and the fourth by an X Factor contestant.  In Ireland it is the fourth best selling single of all time.  His debut album, Letters, was released in the UK on 17 October 2011. The album's first single, "Run For Your Life," written by Gary Barlow, peaked at number 6 on the UK Singles Chart. Letters debuted at number 2 on the UK Albums chart and spent 16 consecutive weeks in the top 40. Two further singles from the album were released, "Starlight" and "Amazing".

Following his split from Columbia/Syco, Cardle's second album, The Fire was released on 29 October 2012 through So What Recordings, part of the Silva Screen Music Group.  The album debuted at number 8 in the UK album chart.  Cardle then released his third album, Porcelain, independently in 2013 .  It reached number 11 on the UK album chart.  The first single, a duet with Melanie C called "Loving You", was released on 18 August 2013 and reached number 14 on the UK Singles Chart. Two further singles were released, "When You Were My Girl" and "Hit My Heart".

Cardle returned to Sony in 2017 and released his fourth album, Time to Be Alive, with them on 27 April 2018.

Cardle announced the release of "Purple Crayon" on 12 January 2021, ahead of the release of his fifth studio album. The song was released digitally on 15 January 2021. Cardle says, "Purple Crayon is song about my struggles with addiction to Valium and the escape I found through using it. The song's emotions are intertwined with imagery from my favourite children's book Harold and the Purple Crayon." O 26 March 2021, Cardle released the second single from his upcoming album, "We're the Butterflies".

Albums

Studio albums

Live albums

Singles

As lead artist

As featured artist

Other charted songs

Other appearances

Music videos

References

Discographies of British artists
Pop music discographies